The 1993 Big East men's basketball tournament took place at Madison Square Garden in New York City, from March 11 to March 14, 1993. Its winner received the Big East Conference's automatic bid to the 1993 NCAA tournament. It is a single-elimination tournament with four rounds.  Seton Hall finished with the best regular season conference and was awarded the #1 seed.

In the largest margin of victory in a Big East tournament championship game, Seton Hall defeated Syracuse, 103–70, to claim its second Big East tournament championship.

Bracket

Awards
Dave Gavitt Trophy (Most Valuable Player): Terry Dehere, Seton Hall

All Tournament Team
 Adrian Autry, Syracuse
 David Cain, St. John's
 Terry Dehere, Seton Hall
 Arturas Karnishovas, Seton Hall
 Lawrence Moten, Syracuse
 Dickey Simpkins, Providence
 Jerry Walker, Seton Hall

References
General:  

Tournament
Big East men's basketball tournament
Basketball in New York City
College sports in New York City
Sports competitions in New York City
Sports in Manhattan
Big East men's basketball tournament
Big East men's basketball tournament
1990s in Manhattan
Madison Square Garden